State of alarm may refer to:
State of emergency, an official announcement  the authorities of an ongoing emergency
State of alarm (Spain), a nationally declared emergency in Spain
State of alarm (Venezuela), a nationally declared emergency in Venezuela